Gora (Cyrillic: Гора) is a geographical region in southern Kosovo and northeastern Albania, primarily inhabited by the Gorani people. Due to geopolitical circumstances, some of the local Gorani people have over time also self declared themselves as Albanians, Macedonians, Bosniaks, Bulgarians, Serbs, Turks and Muslims (nationality).

Gorani inhabited settlements in Albania and Kosovo are synonymous with the geographical outline of Gora as a region. Between 1992 and 1999, the Gora region in Kosovo was designated as a municipality, and its population was 17,574 people according to the 1991 census. Today in Kosovo, the region is part of Dragaš municipality  that includes the Albanian inhabited Opoja region. In Albania, the Gora region is located in Kukës County and parts of it are subdivided in the Shishtavec and Zapod territorial units. Nearby, two Gorani settlements geographically located in the Polog region of North Macedonia are ethnographically and linguistically associated with the Gora region.

Gora is bordered to the west and northwest by the region of Lumë, which is mostly within Albania and a small portion in Kosovo. In the northeast it is bordered by the regions of Opoja, to the east by Polog and to the south by Upper Reka.

Geographical distribution

Albania
The region of Gora within Albania contains 9 Gorani inhabited villages: Zapod, Pakisht, Orçikël, Kosharisht, Cernalevë, Orgjost, Oreshkë, Borje and Shishtavec.

According to the disputed 2011 census figures, just over two-thirds of the population in Shishtavec Municipality identified as Albanian, while 7.7% identified as Macedonian. In Zapod Municipality, 79% identified as Albanian and 11.7% identified as Macedonian.

Kosovo
The region of Gora within Kosovo is made up of 18 Gorani inhabited villages: Baćka, Brod, Vranište, Globočice, Gornja Rapča, Gornji Krstac, Dikance, Donja Rapča, Donji Krstac,  Zli Potok, Kruševo, Kukaljane, Lještane, Ljubošta, Mlike, Orčuša, Radeša, Restelicë and the town of Dragaš. Following 1999, Dragaš has a mixed population of Gorani, whom live in the lower neighbourhood and Albanians in the upper neighbourhood that constitute the majority of inhabitants.

According to 1991 census data, the population of the Gora municipality was composed of:

 Albanians: 22,785
 Gorani: 16,129

The Gora municipality and Opoja region remained separated during the Milošević period. After the 1999 Kosovo war, the Gorani-majority Gora municipality was merged with the Albanian inhabited Opoja region to form the municipality of Dragaš by the United Nations Mission (UNMIK) and the new administrative unit has an Albanian majority. The town of Dragash is the regional and municipal centre for both the Gora and Opoja regions of Dragash municipality.

Kosovo's Gorani people have stated that they want the former Gora municipality with a Gorani majority that was merged with the Albanian-majority Opolje to form the Dragaš municipality which has an Albanian majority) to join the Community of Serb municipalities. On 3 November 2013, 70% voted in favour of establishing the Gora municipality as part of the Community of Serb municipalities, according to Gorani political leader Safet Kuši.

North Macedonia 
In the Republic of North Macedonia, there are two Gorani inhabited villages within Bogovinje Municipality: Jelovjane and Urvič located in the Polog region that neighbours the Gora region. During the Macedonian census of 2001, the population of Jelovjane self declared as Turks (90%) while Urvič self declared as Turks (85%) and Albanians (15%).

Notes

References

External links 
 Gora 1968 part 1 - Short Documentary film about Gora
 Gora 1968 part 2 - Short Documentary film about Gora

Gorani people
Regions of Kosovo
Bogovinje Municipality
Albanian ethnographic regions